The Smith & Dowse was an English automobile manufactured only in 1900.  The company, located in Isleworth, Middlesex, was primarily a motor engineering and repair firm, but it built a few cars to special order.

See also
 List of car manufacturers of the United Kingdom

References
David Burgess Wise, The New Illustrated Encyclopedia of Automobiles.

Defunct motor vehicle manufacturers of England
Motor vehicle manufacturers based in London